Orders and decorations conferred to officers of the Singapore Police Services in Singapore which includes officers from Singapore Police Force, Singapore Prison Service and Central Narcotics Bureau.

Medals

Colonial Era
 King's Police Medal
 Queen's Police Medal
Colonial Police Medal
 Colonial Police Long Service Medal

After World War II 
 Pingat Pertahanan (The Defence Medal)
 Pingat Perkhidmatan Anggota Beruniform Malaysia (Uniformed Services Malaysia Medal)
General Service Medal (Malaya)
 Police Long Service Medal
Good Service Medal
 Johan Mangku Negara (Companion of the Order of the Defender of the Realm) - JMN
 Kesatria Mangku Negara (Officer of the Order of the Defender of the Realm) - KMN
 Ahli Mangku Negara (Member of the Order of the Defender of the Realm) - AMN
 Pingat Pangkuan Negara (Medal of the Order of the Defender of the Realm) - PPN

Present
 Pingat Polis Perkasa (Police Gallantry Medal)
 Pingat Gagah Perkasa (Conspicuous Gallantry Medal)
 Pingat Polis Keberanian (Police Medal of Valour)
Pingat Bakti Setia (Polis) (Long Service Award (Police))
Singapore Police Service Long Service and Good Conduct Medal (35 Years)
Singapore Police Service Long Service and Good Conduct Medal (30 Years)
 Singapore Police Service Long Service and Good Conduct Medal(10 Years)
 Singapore Police Service Good Service Medal
 Pingat Seberang Laut Perhidmatan Polis Singapura (Singapore Police Service Overseas Service Medal)
 Pingat Perkhidmatan Operasi Home Team (Home Team Operational Service Medal) (2014)
Singapore Police Bicentennial 2020 Medal

Certificates
Commissioner Of Police Commendation
Commissioner Of Police Testimonial
Certificate Of Commendation, Police National Service Department

Badges

Skills Badges
 SOC Badge
 K9 Badge
 STAR Badge
 Sniper Badge (Sleeve) (Basic, Senior, Master)
 Parachute Badge (Basic, Senior, Master)
 Parachute Badge Thai Airborne 
 STAR Diver Badge 
 Diver Badge (Basic, Senior, Master )
 Combat Skills Badge (MP5) Badge 
 Gurka (GC) (Sleeve)
 Police Coast Guard (Coxswain (Gold), Crew - Steersman (Silver), Gunner (Bronze))
 Security Command (Seccom) Badge
 Field Instructor (FI) Badge, 3 Grades (Silver, Gold, Red) (Junior - Senior FI Ranks) (Sleeve)
 Police Drone Control, UAV Badge
 ERT Badge 
 Procom Badge (IRT Badge)
 Taekwondo Badge
 Trainer Badge(HTA), 4 Grades (Trainer, Specialist Trainer(Bronze), Principal Trainer(Silver),  Master Trainer(Gold))
 FRT Badge
 RED Teaming Badge

Identification  Badge
 Aide-de-Camp Badge
 SPF200 Badge
 Guard Of Honour Badge
 Crisis Negotiator Badge 
 SPF Overseas Deployment Badge 
 Airport Badge

References

Civil awards and decorations of Singapore
Singapore Police Force
Law enforcement awards and honors